Arne Foldvik (born 6 April 1930) is a Norwegian oceanographer.

He was born in Tromsø as a son of as a son of meteorologist Nils M. Foldvik and Helene Andresen. In 1956 he married teacher Ninja Schibbye Danifer, a daughter of painter Sigurd Danifer.

He finished his secondary education in 1948 and took the cand.real. at the University of Oslo in 1957. After a period as research fellow from 1955 to 1960, at the Norwegian Academy of Science and Letters's Institute for Weather and Climate Research led by Einar Høiland, he was hired as a lecturer at the University of Bergen in 1960. He took the dr.philos. degree here in 1968, was promoted to docent in 1976 and professor in 1985. He also helped build the University Centre in Svalbard. He is a fellow of the Norwegian Academy of Science and Letters since 1992.

References

1930 births
Living people
People from Tromsø
University of Oslo alumni
Academic staff of the University of Bergen
Norwegian oceanographers
Members of the Norwegian Academy of Science and Letters